Liangang Sun (Chinese: 孙连刚), born on January 28, 1969, in Beijing, China, is a Chinese contemporary artist. He is the initiator of contemporary Ideographism, director of Chinese Artists Association, and Curator of Caochangdi Art District.

Sun Liangang with Caochangdi Art District 
Liangang Sun is the founder of Caochangdi Art District. He positioned Caochangdi on a more experimental and more academic level. Sun dedicates to develop Caochangdi to assist young artists while considering less the commercial factors. For instance, the “Zero Capital Policy” provides young artists platforms that bringing them into public.

Exhibition

Sun's Paintings 
Date: 2008

Venue: Louvre

Artist: Sun Liangang

China Contemporary Poet Art Exhibition 
Date: May 19, 2008 - May 25, 2008

Venue: Asia Art Funds

Artist: Bi Jianxun, Chen Yu, Dao Zi, Duo Duo, Lao Che, Mang Ke, Ouyang Jianghe, Song Lin, Sun Lian'gang, Wang Wangwang, Wang Ai, Xi Chuan, Xiao Xiao, Yan Li, Yang Dian, Yu Xinqiao, Zhong Ming

From Here To Eternity 
Date: Nov 3, 2011 - Jan 1, 2012

Venue: Hai Gallery, Beijing, China

Artists: Sonia Falcone, Sun Liangang

Oriental Ideographism 
Date: Dec 8, 2012 - Dec 30, 2012

Venue: FYR Gallery, Florence, Italy

Artist: Sun Liangang

Sun's Sculpture 
Date: Dec 2013

Venue: Sun Art Center, New York City, USA

Artist: Sun Liangang

References

1969 births
Living people
Chinese contemporary artists
Painters from Beijing
Chinese sculptors